The province of Cáceres is a province of western Spain, and makes up the northern half of the autonomous community of Extremadura. Its capital is the city of Cáceres. Other cities in the province include Plasencia, Coria, Navalmoral de la Mata and Trujillo, the birthplace of Francisco Pizarro González. , the province had 408,703 inhabitants, of whom a quarter lived in the capital. The Tagus river runs through the province.

Geography 

The northern natural border of the province is formed by the east–west running Sierra de Gredos which is part of the Sistema Central. The valleys North of Cáceres include the Valle del Jerte, the gorges of la Vera, the Ambroz Valley, and Las Hurdes with mountain rivers and natural pools. The southern border consists of the Montes de Toledo. The remainder of the province is a plain, through which the river Tagus and its tributaries run. The mountains are rich in wildlife, and in 1979 a nature park was created at Monfragüe.

Population
The historical population is given in the following chart:

Economy
The plain is fertile and irrigation is used to raise cereals, tobacco, tomatoes, peppers and cherries, as well as cattle and pigs as some of the most important agricultural products.
The Gabriel y Galán dam one of 3 on the Alagón River produces most of the hydroelectric power for the province.

The third largerst photovoltaic installation in Spain (after the 500 MW Núñez de Balboa solar plant and the 493 MW Mula project) at 300 MW is located in Talavan.

Administrative divisions 
The province was formed in 1839, and is bordered by the provinces of Salamanca, Ávila, Toledo, and Badajoz in the south, and by Portugal in the west.
The capital is the city of Cáceres, where  about a quarter of the 408,703 people in the province lived. Other cities in the province include Plasencia, Coria, Navalmoral de la Mata, Alcántara and Trujillo. 
It consists of 223 municipalities. Traditional comarcas without administrative function in Cáceres Province are Las Villuercas, Las Hurdes and Monfragüe. Las Hurdes was one of the poorest regions in Spain's history.

Sports

The province's main association football team is Cacereño, who currently play in the Segunda División B.

Notes and references

External links 

 Cáceres Turismo